Richard C. Martinez (born March 7, 1953) is an American politician, attorney, and retired judge who served as a member of the New Mexico Senate, from 2001 to 2021.

In the 2020 Democratic primary, Martinez was defeated by Rio Arriba County Commissioner Leo Jaramillo, who was supported by progressives and criticized Martinez for his moderate voting record.

References

External links 
 Senator Richard C. Martinez - (D) at New Mexico Legislature
 Richard Martinez - biography a Project Vote Smart
 Follow the Money – Richard Martinez
 2008 2006 2004 2002 2000 campaign contributions

1953 births
Hispanic and Latino American state legislators in New Mexico
Living people
Democratic Party New Mexico state senators
21st-century American politicians
People from Española, New Mexico